Vitali Vladimirovich Kutuzov (born 20 March 1980) is a Belarusian former professional footballer who played as a forward.

Club career 
Kutuzov was born in Pinsk. He signed with BATE Borisov as an 18-year old in 1998, where he established himself as a  major player and top scorer for the team.

In 2001, Kutuzov joined Serie A side A.C. Milan from BATE Borisov, becoming the club's third Russian-speaking player after Andriy Shevchenko and Kakha Kaladze. However, unlike his former USSR compatriots, he failed to establish himself as an important part of the team, getting to play 37 minutes in four games throughout the entire season.

For 2002–03 football season he was loaned to Primeira Liga side Sporting CP. He played 30 games for them and scored 7 goals, including games in UEFA Cup and the domestic cup.

For the following, 2003–04 season he was again loaned, this time to the Italian Serie B side Avellino. Kutuzov established himself as one of the most important players of the side and a fan-favorite. He played 43 games, scoring 15 goals. Despite his efforts, the team was relegated to Serie C1.

After his successful season in Serie B, he was noticed by the Serie A side U.C. Sampdoria. The club bought half of the rights for the footballer from A.C. Milan in 2004 for €1.5 million and signed him until 2008. In the 2004–05 season he played in 32 games (14 times in starting line-up, totaling 1,604 minutes) and scored 4 goals.

On 20 June 2006, F.C. Parma bought the full rights on Kutuzov from Sampdoria (and in earlier Sampdoria bought Milan's half for €1 million). He signed a three-year contract with them. He was loaned to newly promoted Serie B side Pisa in July 2007. He returned to Parma during the summer of 2008.

In January 2009, he left for A.S. Bari where he finished his career.

International career 
Kutuzov earned over 50 caps for the Belarus national team. On 17 April 2002, he made his debut, contributing two goals in a 5–2 away win over Hungary in a friendly.

Career statistics 
Scores and results list Belarus' goal tally first, score column indicates score after each Kutuzov goal.

Honours 
BATE Borisov
Belarusian Premier League: 1999

Sporting CP
Supertaça Cândido de Oliveira: 2002

References

External links 
 Statistics in Serie A/B and Portugal Superleague

1980 births
Living people
Sportspeople from Pinsk
Belarusian footballers
Association football forwards
Belarus international footballers
Belarusian Premier League players
Serie A players
Serie B players
Primeira Liga players
FC RUOR Minsk players
FC BATE Borisov players
A.C. Milan players
Sporting CP footballers
Pisa S.C. players
U.C. Sampdoria players
Parma Calcio 1913 players
S.S.C. Bari players
U.S. Avellino 1912 players
Belarusian expatriate footballers
Belarusian expatriate sportspeople in Italy
Expatriate footballers in Italy
Belarusian expatriate sportspeople in Portugal
Expatriate footballers in Portugal